Auletta is a surname. Notable people with the surname include:

Gennaro Auletta (born 1957), Italian philosopher
Ken Auletta (born 1942), American writer, journalist and media critic
Loredana Auletta (born 1969), Italian softball player
Pietro Auletta (1698–1771), Italian composer